Yusuf Ibrahim (born 10 June 1986 in Lagos, Nigeria) is a Nigerian footballer, who played for several clubs which include Elyon United (Nigeria), V.I.O. Shooting stars (Nigeria), Hayward 2000 (Holy Family) Air India FC. He also played for Club Valencia Club Valencia (Maldives) . Yusuf Ibrahim continued his playing career with Hòa-Phát Hà Nội FC Hòa Ph% in Vietnam before he moved to Kolkata and played for George Telegraph SC, Mumbai United FC and Raj Milk FC in Patna, India.  Yusuf Ibrahim is currently a AIFF certified Coach.

Career
Ibrahim was born in Lagos Nigeria. He started his football career in Nigeria and played for several clubs across Africa and Asia. Ibrahim played as a midfielder for Air India FC in the I-League, having signed a deal worth $500.000 Prior to that, he played for Mumbai United. which was formally known as Hayward 2000 (Holy Family). In 2017, Yusuf Ibrahim got his AIFF certified license and currently plays for Raj Milk FC Patna, India.

Notes

Nigerian footballers
1986 births
Living people
Expatriate footballers in India
Nigerian expatriate sportspeople in India
I-League players
Association football midfielders
Air India FC players